Anthias are members of the family Serranidae and make up the subfamily Anthiinae. Anthias make up a sizeable portion of the population of pink, orange, and yellow reef fishes seen swarming in most coral reef photography and film. The name Anthiidae is preoccupied by a subfamily of ground beetles in the family Carabidae created by Bonelli in 1813 and this grouping should be called the Anthiadinae. However, both the 5th Edition of Fishes of the World and Fishbase give the Serranid subfamily as "Anthiinae".

Anthias are mostly small, thus are quite popular within the ornamental fish trade. They form complex social structures based on the number of males and females and also their position on the reef itself, and are mainly zooplankton feeders. They occur in all tropical oceans and seas of the world. The first species recognized in this group was described in the Mediterranean and northeast Atlantic and was given name Anthias anthias by Carl Linnaeus in 1758.

Anthias can shoal by the thousands. Anthias do school in these large groups, though they tend toward more intimate subdivisions within the school, appropriately called "harems". These consist of one dominant, colorful male, and two to 12 females — which have their own hierarchy among them — and up to two 'subdominant' males, often less brightly colored and not territorial. Within the swarm of females, territorial males perform acrobatic U-swim displays and vigorously defend an area of the reef and its associated harem.

Most anthias are protogynous hermaphrodites. These anthias are born female; if a dominant male perishes, the largest female of the group will often change into a male to take its place. This may lead to squabbling between the next-largest male, which sees an opportunity to advance, and the largest female, whose hormones are surging with testosterone. 

Seven genera of anthias are known to occur in coral reef ecosystems: Holanthias, Luzonichthys, Nemanthias, Plectranthias, Pseudanthias, Rabaulichthys, and Serranocirrhitus. Members of all these genera make it into the aquarium trade, although Pseudanthias is by far the most encountered in the hobby.

Genera
The following genera are classified within the Anthiinae:

 Acanthistius Gill, 1862
 Anatolanthias Anderson, Parin & Randall, 1990
 Anthias Bloch, 1792
 Baldwinella  Anderson & Heemstra, 2012
 Caesioperca Castelnau, 1872
 Caprodon Temminck & Schlegel, 1843
 Choranthias Anderson & Heemstra, 2012
 Dactylanthias Bleeker, 1871
 Epinephelides Ogilby, 1899
 Giganthias Katayama, 1954
 Hemanthias Steindachner, 1875
 Holanthias Günther 1868
 Hypoplectrodes Gill, 1862
 Lepidoperca Regan, 1914
 Luzonichthys Herre, 1936
 Meganthias Randall & Heemstra, 2006
 Nemanthias J.L.B. Smith, 1954
 Odontanthias Bleeker, 1873
 Othos Castelnau, 1875
 Plectranthias Bleeker, 1873
 Pronotogrammus Gill, 1863
 Pseudanthias Bleeker, 1871
 Rabaulichthys Allen, 1984
 Sacura Jordan & Richardson, 1910
 Selenanthias Tanaka, 1918
 Serranocirrhitus Watanabe, 1949
 Tosana  H.M. Smith & Pope, 1906
 Tosanoides Kamohara, 1953
 Trachypoma Günther, 1859

References

 
Serranidae
Fish subfamilies